The Waddell "A" Truss Bridge, also known by its original name of Linn Branch Creek Bridge is one of two surviving examples of the "A" Truss Bridge type originated by John Alexander Low Waddell.  It was originally completed in 1898 near Trimble, Missouri, and is currently located at English Landing Park in Parkville, Platte County, Missouri.  The bridge was relocated in 1987 and listed on the National Register of Historic Places in 1991.

History 
It carried a single-tracked segment of the Quincy, Omaha, and Kansas City Railroad between Plattsburg and Trimble. The structure was fabricated by the Pencoyd Iron Works of Philadelphia, and it operated in railroad configuration for over 40 years until the line was abandoned in 1939.

In 1953, the Missouri Highway Department renovated the bridge deck to roadway and repurposed the rail line for Missouri State Route 4.  By 1972, construction on the future Smithville Lake had begun, rendering the road defunct and threatening the bridge's future.  Shortly before the reservoir was impounded in 1979, the bridge was determined eligible to be listed among the National Register of Historic Places.  It was catalogued by the Historic American Engineering Record (HAER) before being marked, disassembled, and stored by United States Army Corps of Engineers in 1980.

The bridge was restored and reassembled at its current location, English Landing Park, in 1987 at a cost of $1,500.  The restoration was a volunteer effort led by civil engineering professor George F.W. Hauck of the University of Missouri–Kansas City, with the assistance of students and other industry professionals.  The project won the American Society of Civil Engineers (ASCE) "Outstanding Civil Engineering Award of Merit" in 1989, and was listed on the National Register of Historic Places in 1990.

The other surviving Waddell "A" Truss bridge spans the Cross Bayou in Shreveport, Louisiana. Now abandoned, the bridge once carried the Kansas City Southern Railway across the bayou. It has been listed on the National Register as Kansas City Southern Railroad Bridge, Cross Bayou, and is recognized as a historic site by the City of Shreveport.

See also
List of bridges documented by the Historic American Engineering Record in Missouri

References

External links

Railroad bridges in Missouri
Buildings and structures in Platte County, Missouri
Steel bridges in the United States
Truss bridges in the United States
Historic American Engineering Record in Missouri
Railroad bridges on the National Register of Historic Places in Missouri
Bridges completed in 1898
National Register of Historic Places in Platte County, Missouri